Seoul Subway Line 2, also known as the Circle Line, is a circular line of the Seoul Metropolitan Subway. The line running clockwise is called the "inner circle line" and the counter-clockwise line is called the "outer circle line". The Line 2 loop is the second longest subway loop in the world after Beijing Subway Line 10. In 2019, Line 2 had an annual ridership of 812 million passengers or 2.2 million passengers per day.

Headways on the line vary from 2 minutes 18 seconds on peak periods  and 5–6 minutes off-peak periods. The line connects the city centre to Gangnam, Teheran Valley and the COEX/KWTC complex.

History 
Line 2 was built in 1978–84 together with the Seongsu Branch (the second Sinjeong Branch was built 1989–95). Dangsan bridge was closed for reconstruction in 1996 and reopened November 22, 1999.

Yongdu station on the Seongsu Branch (between Sindap and Sinseol stations) is the first station in the Seoul Subway system with operating platform screen doors. As of 2008 platform screen doors are operating at all stations along Line 2. New rolling stock has also progressively came on line, replacing older vehicles.

October 31, 1980: Sinseol-dong – Sports Complex (via Seongsu) section opened
December 23, 1982: Sports Complex – Seoul Nat'l Univ. of Education section opened
September 16, 1983: Euljiro 1-ga – Seongsu section opened; Sinseol-dong – Seongsu section separated as Seongsu Branch
December 17, 1983: Seoul Nat'l Univ. of Education – Seoul Nat'l University section opened
May 22, 1984: Seoul Nat'l University – Euljiro 1-ga (via Sindorim) section opened; Circle Line completed
May 22, 1992: Sindorim – Yangcheon-gu Office section opened as Sinjeong Branch
February 29, 1996: Sinjeongnegeori Station opened as extension of Sinjeong Branch
March 20, 1996: Kkachisan Station opened as extension of Sinjeong Branch
October 20, 2005: Yongdu Station opened on the Seongsu Branch

Facilities
In December 2010 the line is recorded as having the highest WiFi data consumption in the Seoul Metropolitan area. It averaged 2.56 times more than the other 14 subway lines fitted with WiFi service zones.

In 2011, retailer Homeplus opened the world's first virtual supermarket at Seolleung station, where smartphone users can photograph the bar code of life-size pictures, on the walls and platform screen doors, of 500 items of food, toiletries, electronics etc., for delivery within the same day.

Stations

Main Line

Seongsu Branch

Sinjeong Branch

Extension 
There is a possible extension currently in the conception stage to extend the Sinjeong Branch to 3.7 km to Gayang Station on Line 9. The path would include a new station named Gangseo-gu Office in between Kkachisan and Gayang.

Route map

See also
 Subways in South Korea
 Seoul Metropolitan Subway

References

External links 
 Seoul Metro
 Map, station and route finder

 
Seoul Metropolitan Subway lines
Railway loop lines
Railway lines opened in 1980
1980 establishments in South Korea